Baraka Bounao is a settlement in the Ziguinchor Department in the Ziguinchor Region in the Basse Casamance area of south-west Senegal. In the 2002 census, the village contained 189 inhabitants in 26 households.

References

External links
PEPAM

Populated places in the Ziguinchor Department